Jacqueline Vogt (born 7 March 1969) is a Liechtensteiner former alpine skier who competed in the 1988 Winter Olympics.

References

External links
 

1969 births
Living people
Liechtenstein female alpine skiers
Olympic alpine skiers of Liechtenstein
Alpine skiers at the 1988 Winter Olympics